Myron Haliburton Avery (1899–1952) was an American lawyer, hiker and explorer.  Born in Lubec, Maine, Avery was a protégé of Judge Arthur Perkins and a collaborator and sometimes rival of Benton MacKaye.  He was president of the Potomac Appalachian Trail Club from 1927 to 1941 and chairman of the Appalachian Trail Conference from 1931 to his death in 1952.  The first 2000 Miler of the Appalachian Trail, he was also an alumnus of Bowdoin College and Harvard Law School.

Upon graduating from Harvard Law School, Avery practised Admiralty law with the law firm "Arthur Perkins", in Hartford, Maine.  He was a Naval veteran, having served in both World War I and World War II, receiving the Legion of Merit during his service.

Legacy
After his death, a mountaintop on the Appalachian Trail in Maine was renamed "Avery Peak" in his honor. The "east peak" of Bigelow Mountain is given as 4088 ft and identified as Myron H Avery Peak on the 1956 Stratton, Maine 15 minute Quadrangle issued by the USGS in Washington D.C.  A lean-to was built below the peak's summit and named for him in 1953, but is now no longer standing.

On June 17, 2011, he was inducted into the Appalachian Trail Hall of Fame at the Appalachian Trail Museum as a charter member.

Quotations
"To those who would see the Maine wilderness, tramp day by day through a succession of ever delightful forest, past lake and stream, and over mountains, we would say: Follow the Appalachian Trail across Maine. It cannot be followed on horse or awheel. Remote for detachment, narrow for chosen company, winding for leisure, lonely for contemplation, it beckons not merely north and south but upward to the body, mind and soul of man." - Myron Avery, In the Maine Woods, 1934

External links
 History of the Appalachian Trail in Maine; Part I: The Avery Years
 Maine State Library Index to Articles, Books and Manuscripts in the Myron Avery Collection
 Digitized materials from Maine State Library Myron Avery Collection
 Appalachian Trail Conservancy (formerly Conference)
 Appalachian Trail Conservancy - History section
 Potomac Appalachian Trail Club
 Maine Appalachian Trail Club

Sources
Anderson, Larry. 2002. Benton MacKaye: Conservationist, Planner, and Creator of the Appalachian Trail. Johns Hopkins University Press. .
Luxenberg, Larry. 1995. Walking the Appalachian Trail. Stackpole Books. .

1899 births
1952 deaths
Hikers
American non-fiction outdoors writers
American male non-fiction writers
Bowdoin College alumni
Harvard Law School alumni
People from Lubec, Maine
Writers from Maine
Appalachian Trail
American nature writers
20th-century American male writers